BQ (former name: Mundo Reader) is a Spanish company brand of user electronics devices, such as smartphones, tablets, e-readers and 3D printers among other products.

Among BQ's most notable products are the first AndroidOne mobile phone in Europe (the BQ Aquaris A4.5), as well as both the world's first mobile phone and tablet running the Ubuntu Phone operating system, (the BQ Aquaris E4.5 and BQ Aquaris M10). In 2018, the Vietnamese conglomerate Vingroup acquired 51% share of BQ and active in Vietnam under the name of VinSmart.

History 
The company started its business in 2009 importing e-readers from Asia.
In 2010 it started to produce its own tablets and e-readers.

In 2013, the company had 600 employees and it produced 400,000 tablets and 100,000 e-readers.

In 2014, the company entered the Portuguese market.

In 2015, the company produced a smartphone (BQ Aquaris E4.5 Ubuntu Edition) that runs the Ubuntu operating system.

In 2016, the company released the BQ Aquaris M10 Ubuntu Edition tablet.

By 2020, bq appears no longer to be in the phone market, with all devices removed from the company's web-page. The English language home-page now presents Robotics, 3D-printing and product development consulting as the focus of the company, at least internationally.

In 2021 their web-page informed visitors that it had ceased business operations and only made available links to software downloads for the 3D-printer Witbox Go and to their educational offerings.

Revenue, by year:
 2014: 202.5 million euro.
 2013: 115 million euro.
 2012: 37.3 million euro.
 2011: 25 million euro.
 2010: 3.8 million euro.

Mobile phones and tablets 
AndroidOne:
 BQ Aquaris X2 Pro
 BQ Aquaris X2
 BQ Aquaris A4.5

Android high-end:
 BQ Aquaris X Pro
 BQ Aquaris X
 BQ Aquaris X5 Plus
 BQ Aquaris X5

Android mid-range:
 BQ Aquaris M5
 BQ Aquaris E4.5
 BQ Aquaris E5

Android Cyanogen:
 BQ Aquaris M5
 BQ Aquaris X5 Cyanogen Edition

Ubuntu Phone:
 BQ Aquaris M10
 BQ Aquaris E4.5
 BQ Aquaris E5

Other:
 BQ Aquaris E6
 BQ Aquaris E4

See also
VinSmart
 List of mobile phone makers by country
 Comparison of tablets
 Comparison of bq smartphones

References

Electronics companies of Spain
Spanish brands